MeTA1 is a mail transfer agent (MTA) that has been designed with these main topics in minds: security, reliability, efficiency, configurability and extendibility. It supports the Simple Mail Transfer Protocol (SMTP) as specified by RFC 2821 and various extensions.

New development
The next generation of Sendmail was initially called Sendmail X; it was previously called Sendmail 9, but it does not derive from the Sendmail version 8 code base. However, the development of Sendmail X was stopped in favor of a new project called MeTA1.

The first release of Sendmail X smX-0.0.0.0 was made available on October 30, 2005. The final release was smX-1.0.PreAlpha7.0, released on May 20, 2006, under the same license used by Sendmail 8.

MeTA1 1.0.0.0 was released on May 25, 2014.

External links
 Sendmail, Inc.

Message transfer agents
Free email server software
Companies based in Emeryville, California
Email server software for Linux